Embodied embedded cognition (EEC) is a philosophical theoretical position in cognitive science, closely related to situated cognition, embodied cognition, embodied cognitive science and dynamical systems theory. The theory states that intelligent behaviour emerges from the interplay between brain, body and world. The world is not just the 'play-ground' on which the brain is acting. Rather, brain, body and world are equally important factors in the explanation of how particular intelligent behaviours come about in practice.

Embodiment and embeddedness

EEC is divided into two aspects: embodiment and embeddedness (or situatedness).

Embodiment refers to the idea that the body's internal milieu (a.o. homeostatic and hormonal states) heavily influences the higher 'cognitive' processes in the brain, presumably via the emotional system (see e.g. Antonio Damasio's theory of somatic markers). To put it simply: the state of your body is a direct factor of importance on the kinds of cognitive processes that may arise in the higher parts of your brain.

Embeddedness refers to the idea that physical interaction between the body and the world strongly constrain the possible behaviours of the organism, which in turn influences (indeed, partly constitutes) the cognitive processes that emerge from the interaction between organism and world.

The theory is an explicit reaction to the currently dominant cognitivist paradigm, which states that cognitive systems are essentially computational-representational systems (like computer software), processing input and generating output (behaviour) on the basis of internal information processing. In cognitivism, the causal root of behaviour lies in the 'virtual' processes governed by the software that runs on our brains. The brain is purely the hardware on which the software is implemented. The body (sensors and actors) are purely input-output devices that are in service of the brain. The world is merely the play-ground (the object) in which the cognitive agent acts.

In contrast, EEC holds that the actual physical processes in body and in body-world interaction partly constitute whatever it is that we call 'the cognitive system' as a whole. Body, world and brain form a system. Together these system-parts 'cause' intelligent behaviour to arise as a system property. Dynamical Systems Theory is a way of modeling behaviour that teams up quite naturally with the theoretical concepts of EEC. The theory of practopoiesis describes the rules adaptive systems need to obey if they are to successfully implement embodied and embedded cognition.

Current discussions include:
 Is EEC really a (positive) theory of itself, or merely a bunch of complaints about what is wrong about (a too extreme version of) cognitivism? 
 Is EEC too 'descriptive', instead of really explaining anything about cognition?
 How can EEC explain linguistic processes and processes of explicit conscious reasoning?
 What would be the most informative empirical hypotheses, starting from an EEC perspective?
 Can we use traditional methods (stimulus-response paradigms) of experimental psychology to test EEC hypotheses?

Theorists

Theorists that inspired the EEC programme (but might not necessarily adhere to the above position) include:

 Lawrence Barsalou
 Randall Beer
 Valentino Braitenberg
 Rodney Brooks
 William Clancey
 Andy Clark
 Paul Dourish
 Gerald Edelman
 Shaun Gallagher
 Vittorio Guidano
 Pim Haselager
 Martin Heidegger
 Susan Hurley
 Edmund Husserl
 Edwin Hutchins
 Fred Keijzer
 David Kirsh
 Humberto Maturana
 Maurice Merleau-Ponty
 Alva Noë
 Jean Piaget
 Eleanor Rosch
 Mark Rowlands
 Evan Thompson
 Francisco Varela
 Jacob Von Uexküll
 Dan Zahavi
 Tom Ziemke

See also

Autopoesis
Enactivism
Extended cognition
Neuroconstructivism
Neurophenomenology
Practopoiesis
Pragmatism
Situated cognition

References

External links
Some EEC links

Cognitive science